The 2011 MTN 8 was the 37th time that this annual tournament took place. It was contested by the eight top teams of the Premier Soccer League table at the end of the 2010-11 season. The tournament began on 5 August 2011.

Teams
The eight teams that competed in the MTN 8 Wafa Wafa knockout competition are: (listed according to their finishing position in the 2010–11 Premier Soccer League).

 1. Orlando Pirates
 2. Ajax Cape Town
 3. Kaizer Chiefs
 4. Mamelodi Sundowns
 5. Bloemfontein Celtic
 6. Bidvest Wits
 7. Supersport United
 8. Santos

Fixtures & Results

New rule for MTN8

On 28 July 2011 The PSL Executive Committee held a meeting to discuss the issue of home and away fixtures. There has been an amendment to the MTN8 rules pertaining to the issue of home and away fixtures. 	
	
		The approved rule reads as follows: In the first round of the competition (last 8 or quarter-finals) the clubs finishing in the top four positions of the Premier Division in the previous season will be the home clubs.

Quarter-finals

Teams through to the Semi-finals

 1 Ajax Cape Town
 2 Mamelodi Sundowns
 3 Orlando Pirates
 4 Kaizer Chiefs

The draw for the Semi-finals was held on Monday 8 August 2011.

Semi-finals

|}
 Kaizer Chiefs advance to the final on away goal.

1st Leg

2nd Leg

Final

External links
Premier Soccer League
South African Football Association

MTN 8
MTN
2011 domestic association football cups